Huel, manufactured by Huel Ltd., is a meal replacement and therapeutic food available in powder, protein shake, protein bar, grain or pasta forms. Its products are made from oats, rice protein, pea protein, sunflower, flaxseed, coconut oil MCTs, and several dietary supplements (vitamins and minerals). Most products are sweetened with sucralose or stevia.

The product's name is a portmanteau of human fuel.

History
In 2014, Huel was founded by Julian Hearn in Aylesbury, England. The original recipe was formulated by registered nutritionist James Collier, founder and former owner of MuscleTalk, a bodybuilding website, with the intention of providing the recommended daily amounts (RDAs) of nutrients as stipulated by the European Food Safety Authority, in a vegan and environmentally friendly product.

Huel powder, the first product, was released in 2015 and is sold in 1.7 kg white bags. Its ingredients contain oats, rice, pea protein, and micronutrients. Huel Powder is made up of 37% carbohydrates, 30% fat, 30% protein, and 3% fibre. Black Edition was released in December 2019, it contains 50% fewer carbohydrates, 33% more protein compared to the original Huel powder and is sweetened with stevia and organic coconut sugar, instead of artificial sweetener.

A version for gluten-free diets was launched in 2016, and Huel began delivering to the rest of Europe. In June 2017, it became available in the United States.

In November 2017, former Life Health Foods UK chief executive James McMaster was appointed as chief executive officer of the company to oversee its international expansion.

Controversies and criticism

Misleading advertising
In February 2023, the British Advertising Standards Authority banned two Huel advertisements after ruling that claims that Huel could help people save money were misleading, and that one of the advertisements violated the rules on making health claims about products.

Taste and texture
Huel has been criticized for its underwhelming taste, lumpy texture, and "boring" flavors.

References

External links
 

Dietary supplements
Food and drink companies established in 2014
Nutritional supplement companies of the United Kingdom
Vegan brands
Vegetarian companies and establishments of the United Kingdom
Vegetarian diets